Munjong of Goryeo (29 December 1019 – 2 September 1083) was the 11th monarch of the Goryeo Dynasty, who ruled Korea from 1046 to 1083.

King Munjong was born in 1019 and reigned from 1046 until his death in 1083. During his reign, the central government of Goryeo gained complete authority and power over local lords. Munjong, and later kings, emphasized the importance of civilian leadership over the military. Munjong expanded Korea's borders northward to the Yalu and Tumen Rivers.

Munjong's fourth son, Uicheon (born 1055), became a Buddhist priest who founded the Cheontae as an independent school of Buddhism.

Family
Father: Hyeonjong of Goryeo
Mother: Queen Wonhye
Consorts and their Respective issue(s): 
Queen Inpyeong of the Ansan Kim clan; half younger sister – No issue.
Queen Inye of the Gyeongwon Yi clan (d. 1092)
Crown Prince Wang Hun
Wang Un, Duke Gukwon
Wang Ong, Duke Gyerim
Wang Hu
Wang Su, Duke Sangan (왕수 상안공)
Wang Taeng
Wang Bi, Marquess Geumgwan (왕비 금관후)
Wang Eum, Marquess Byeonhan (왕음 변한후)
Wang Chim, Marquess Nakrang (왕침 낙랑후)
Wang Gyeong (왕경)
Princess Jeokgyeong (적경궁주)
Princess Boryeong
Unborn daughter
Unborn daughter
Worthy Consort Ingyeong of the Gyeongwon Yi clan
Wang Do, Duke Joseon
Wang Su, Duke Buyeo
Wang Yu, Duke Jinhan
Worthy Consort Injeol of the Gyeongwon Yi clan (d. 1082)
Unnamed daughter, died early
Unnamed daughter, died early
Virtuous Consort Inmok of the Gyeongju Kim clan (d. 1094)
Unnamed daughter, died early

References

Eckert, Lee, Lew, Robinson and Wagner, Korea Old and New: A History, Harvard University Press, 1990. 

1019 births
1083 deaths
11th-century Korean monarchs
People from Kaesong